Vanellus is the genus of waders which provisionally contains all lapwings except red-kneed dotterel, Erythrogonys cinctus. The name "vanellus" is Latin for "little fan", vanellus being the diminutive of vannus ("winnowing fan"). The name is in reference to the sound lapwings' wings make in flight.

Description
These long-legged waders mostly have strongly patterned plumage. Although the most familiar Eurasian lapwing, Vanellus vanellus (northern lapwing), has a wispy crest, only two other species do so. Red or yellow facial wattles are a more typical decoration.

Only northern, sociable, white-tailed, grey-headed and brown-chested lapwings are truly migratory species. The Andean lapwing moves downhill in winter.

Spur-winged, blacksmith, river, southern, Andean and pied lapwings are boldly patterned, red-eyed species with a spurred carpal (wrist) joint.

Many species have wattles which can be small (black-headed, spot-breasted, red-wattled and banded lapwings) or large (white-crowned, African wattled, yellow-wattled, Javan, and masked lapwings). The latter species are the largest of the plover family, since several exceed .

Systematics
The genus Vanellus was erected by the French zoologist Mathurin Jacques Brisson in 1760. The name was derived by tautonymy from the original binomial name of the northern lapwing Tringa vanellus introduced by Linnaeus in 1758. Vanellus is the Medieval Latin for a "lapwing". It is a diminutive of the Latin vanus meaning "winnowing" or "fan".

The systematics of Vanellus have hitherto resisted clear resolution. Essentially, no major revision can be brought to agree with another, and up to 19 genera were at one time recognized for the 24 lapwing species. While it might be desirable to split up this large and diverse genus a bit, the morphological characters are a confusing mix of apomorphic and plesiomorphic traits in any one species, with few relationships readily apparent. Molecular data has been found to provide even less sufficient resolution, though the lapwings have not yet been as thoroughly studied under this aspect as other Charadriiformes.

The only thing that can be said with a fair degree of certainty is that according to the DNA sequence data one group of 5 species seems to stand out. These are wattle-less lapwings which were separated as Anitibyx, Belonopterus, Hoplopterus (in the narrow sense) and Ptiloscelys. They are visually very dissimilar, but it is notable that their distribution forms a clean band through the tropical regions of the world except Australia; they might conceivably form a clade. The only species among them that is migratory is the Andean lapwing (V. resplendens), which as noted above cannot be allied with the truly migratory lapwings on these grounds. However, if these were to be split off, for one thing it is almost certain that other lineages would also require separation; the new genus' name would probably be Hoplopterus, which is the longest- and most widely used alternative lapwing genus.

List of species in taxonomic order
 Northern lapwing, also known as green plover and as peewit, Vanellus vanellus
Alternatively placed in Hemiparra:
 Long-toed lapwing, Vanellus crassirostris
Alternatively placed in Anitibyx:
 Blacksmith lapwing or blacksmith plover, Vanellus armatus
Alternatively placed in Hoplopterus:
 Spur-winged lapwing or "spur-winged plover", Vanellus spinosus
 River lapwing or "spur-winged lapwing", Vanellus duvaucelii
Alternatively placed in Sarciophorus, Lobivanellus or Hoplopterus:
 Black-headed lapwing or black-headed plover, Vanellus tectus
Alternatively placed in Lobipluvia or Hoplopterus:
 Yellow-wattled lapwing, Vanellus malabaricus
Alternatively placed in Xiphidiopterus or Hoplopterus:
 White-crowned lapwing, white-headed lapwing, white-crowned plover or white-headed plover, Vanellus albiceps
Alternatively placed in Stephanibyx or Hoplopterus:
 Senegal lapwing or lesser black-winged lapwing, Vanellus lugubris
 Black-winged lapwing or greater black-winged lapwing, Vanellus melanopterus

 Crowned lapwing or crowned plover, Vanellus coronatus
Alternatively placed in Afribyx:
 African wattled lapwing or wattled lapwing, Vanellus senegallus
Alternatively placed in Tylibyx, Lobivanellus or Hoplopterus:
 Spot-breasted lapwing, Vanellus melanocephalus
Alternatively placed in Anomalophrys:
 Brown-chested lapwing, Vanellus superciliosus
Alternatively placed in Microsarcops or Hoplopterus:
 Grey-headed lapwing, Vanellus cinereus
Alternatively placed in Lobivanellus or Hoplopterus:
 Red-wattled lapwing, Vanellus indicus
Alternatively placed in Rogibyx:
 Javan lapwing, Javanese lapwing, or Javanese wattled lapwing, Vanellus macropterus
Alternatively placed in Zonifer, Lobivanellus or Hoplopterus:
 Banded lapwing, Vanellus tricolor
Alternatively placed in Lobibyx, Lobivanellus or Hoplopterus:
 Masked lapwing or "spur-winged plover", Vanellus miles
Alternatively placed in Chettusia:
 Sociable lapwing or sociable plover, Vanellus gregarius
Alternatively placed in Vanellochettusia or Chettusia:
 White-tailed lapwing or white-tailed plover, Vanellus leucurus
Alternatively placed in Hoploxypterus:
 Pied lapwing, Vanellus cayanus
Alternatively placed in Belonopterus:
 Southern lapwing, Vanellus chilensis
Alternatively placed in Ptiloscelys or Belonopterus:
 Andean lapwing, Vanellus resplendens

Prehistoric species
Species known only from fossil or subfossil remains include:
 Vanellus madagascariensis (14th century Madagascar)
 Vanellus liffyae (Late Pliocene of central Australia)
 Vanellus lilloi (Middle/Late Pleistocene of Centinela del Mar, Argentina)
 Vanellus downsi (Late Pleistocene of Rancho La Brea, USA)
 Vanellus edmundi (Late Pleistocene of Talalra, Peru)

The last three of these seem to be very closely related to the southern lapwing and all were placed in Belonopterus by the describing authors. If Viator picis, also from the Late Pleistocene of Talara, does not belong to an entirely extinct lineage, it might belong to that group too; it seems too large to be closely related to the smallish pied lapwing.

Neither the Early Oligocene Dolicopterus from Ronzon, France nor the supposed mid-Oligocene lapwing "Vanellus" selysii of Rupelmonde (Belgium) unquestionably belong here. While their age suggests that they may indeed represent some ancient lapwings, the fossil remains have not been studied for many decades and a review is seriously overdue.

References

Sources

 Campbell, Kenneth E. Jr. (2002): A new species of Late Pleistocene lapwing from Rancho La Brea, California [English with Spanish abstract]. Condor 104: 170–174.  HTML abstract and first page image
 Mlíkovský, Jirí (2002): Cenozoic Birds of the World, Part 1: Europe. Ninox Press, Prague.  PDF fulltext
 Piersma, Theunis & Wiersma, Popko (1996): Family Charadriidae (Plovers). In: del Hoyo, Josep; Elliott, Andrew & Sargatal, Jordi (eds.): Handbook of Birds of the World (Volume 3: Hoatzin to Auks): 384–443, plates 35–39. Lynx Edicions, Barcelona.

Further reading

 Hayman, Peter; Marchant, John & Prater, Tony (1986): Shorebirds: an identification guide to the waders of the world. Houghton Mifflin, Boston. 
 Terres, John K. & National Audubon Society (1980): The Audubon Society Encyclopedia of North American Birds. Alfred A. Knopf, New York.

External links
 
 
 Lapwing videos on the Internet Bird Collection

 
Bird genera
Taxa named by Mathurin Jacques Brisson